Richard Lonsdell was a Canadian Anglican priest, most notably  the first Archdeacon of St Andrews in the Diocese of Montreal.

MacLean was educated at Bishop's University and ordained in 1840. After a curacy at  Kingsey he held incumbencies at La Prairie and Hochelaga.

References

19th-century Canadian Anglican priests
Archdeacons of St Andrews, PQ
Bishop's University alumni